Valley Pathways High School is located in Palmer, Alaska, United States. It is an alternative high school, offering small class sizes and close relationships to the teachers. 
Valley Pathways was created to accommodate the growing number of students attending Burchell High School. 
At the end of the 2010/2011 school year Valley Pathways had a class size of over 200 students. 
Although Valley Pathways does not offer an athletic program there are music and extracurricular courses.

References

External links
School website

Alternative schools in the United States
Educational institutions in the United States with year of establishment missing
Public high schools in Alaska
Schools in Matanuska-Susitna Borough, Alaska